The Serbia men's national under-18 ice hockey team is the men's national under-18 ice hockey team of Serbia. The team is controlled by the Serbian Ice Hockey Association, a member of the International Ice Hockey Federation. The team represents Serbia at the IIHF World U18 Championships.

International competitions

IIHF World U18 Championships

2007: 6th in Division II Group B
2008: 1st in Division III Group B
2009: 5th in Division II Group B
2010: 4th in Division II Group A
2011: 5th in Division II Group A
2012: 2nd in Division II Group B
2013: 3rd in Division II Group B
2014: 3rd in Division II Group B
2015: 3rd in Division II Group B

External links
Serbia at IIHF.com

under
National under-18 ice hockey teams